Malabar pepper is a variety of black pepper that originated as a chance seedling in a geographical region that now forms part of the present-day state of Kerala in India.  
The area of production of this variety of pepper now covers all the regions that are part of the Malabar Coast. 
Malabar pepper was one of the commodities most sought after by the ancient Roman and Arab traders, and later by the early European navigators. 

Malabar pepper is classified under two grades known as garbled and un-garbled. The garbled variety is black in colour nearly globular with a wrinkled surface. The ungarbled variety has a wrinkled surface and the colour varies from dark brown to black. The plant (Piper nigrum) is a flowering vine in the family Piperaceae, cultivated for its fruit,  which is usually dried and used as a spice and seasoning. The fruit, known as a peppercorn when dried, is a small drupe five millimetres in diameter, dark red when fully mature, containing a single seed.

"Malabar pepper" has been granted registration in Part A under Sub-section (1) of Section 13 of Geographical Indications of Goods (Registration and Protection) Act, 1999. The application for registration was made by Spices Board, Ministry of Commerce and Industry, Government of India.

Other spices from India that have obtained Geographical Indication recognition from the Geographical Indication Registry of India are the following:

    Alleppey Green Cardamom
    Coorg Green Cardamom
    Naga Mircha (Chilli)
    Guntur Sannam Chilli
    Byadagi chilli
    Sikkim Large Cardamom
    Mizo Chilli
    Assam Karbi Anglong Ginger

References

Kerala cuisine
Piper (plant)
Geographical indications in Kerala